Jin Yi or Zhongyi (1889–13 August 1948), better known by his stage name Jin Shaoshan, was a Manchu Peking opera singer.


Life
Jin's father was Jin Xiushan (Jīn Xiùshān), who also a Peking opera singer.

Jin was best known for his "painted face" roles    and served as a mentor to Li Yuru.

References

Citations

Bibliography
 .

1889 births
1948 deaths
20th-century Chinese  male singers
Male actors from Beijing
Singers from Beijing
20th-century Chinese male actors
Chinese male Peking opera actors
Manchu male actors
Manchu singers
Chinese male silent film actors